Winthrop Square may refer to:

Winthrop Square (Boston), a public square in Boston's financial district
Winthrop Square (Charlestown, Boston), a public square in Boston's Charlestown neighbourhood